Li Xiangning (born May 11, 2000) is a Chinese figure skater. She is the 2018 Cup of Nice silver medalist. the 2018 Chinese national champion, and a two-time Chinese national silver medalist (2016, 2017). 

On the junior level, she is the 2016 Youth Olympic champion in the team event.

She placed 22nd at the 2018 Winter Olympics and 12th at the 2016 Youth Olympics.

Li switched to pair skating during the 2018–19 figure skating season, partnering with Xie Zhong, but has since returned to singles before ever debuting competitively in pairs.

Career

Early years 
Li began learning to skate in 2004. She debuted on the ISU Junior Grand Prix series in August 2013, placing 10th in Riga, Latvia.

2014–2015 season 
Li qualified to the final segment in her first appearance at an ISU Championship – the World Junior Championships, held in March in Tallinn, Estonia; she placed 24th in the short program, 20th in the free skate, and 21st overall.

2015–2016 season 
In February 2016, Li placed 12th in her individual event at the Winter Youth Olympic in Hamar, Norway. She won gold in the team event, having competed as a member of Team Desire. The following month, she finished 20th at the 2016 World Junior Championships in Debrecen, Hungary.

2016–2017 season 
Li's senior international debut came in November 2016 at the Cup of China; she finished 10th at her first Grand Prix assignment. She ranked 13th at the 2017 Four Continents Championships in Gangneung, South Korea, and then 11th at the 2017 World Junior Championships in Taipei, Taiwan. Concluding her season, she placed 14th — seven places ahead of China's other entry in the ladies' event, Li Zijun — at the 2017 World Championships in Helsinki, Finland.

2017–2018 season 
Li won her first senior international medal, silver, at the International Cup of Nice in October 2017. In January, she finished tenth at the 2018 Four Continents Championships in Taipei. In February, she competed at the 2018 Winter Olympics in PyeongChang, South Korea. She qualified to the final segment and finished 22nd overall. She was less successful at the 2018 World Championships in Milan, Italy. Ranked 26th in the short program, she did not advance to the free skate.

2018–2019 season 
In 2018, Li teamed up with Xie Zhong to compete in pair skating. The new pair was invited to two Grand Prix events, the 2018 Skate America and 2018 Grand Prix of Helsinki. It was unclear how the two were eligible according to the International Skating Union's rules for the Grand Prix series. They later withdrew from both competitions.

Programs

Pair skating with Xie

Single skating

Competitive highlights 
GP: Grand Prix; JGP: Junior Grand Prix

Pair skating with Xie

Single skating

References

External links 

 

2000 births
Chinese female single skaters
Living people
Sportspeople from Qiqihar
Figure skaters at the 2016 Winter Youth Olympics
Figure skaters at the 2018 Winter Olympics
Olympic figure skaters of China
Figure skaters from Heilongjiang